The Hogon-ji Temple is located on the sacred Chikubu Island in Shiga Prefecture, Japan. It is part of a temple complex on the revered island. It is a Buddhist temple dedicated to the goddess Benzaiten. Also, it is said to have first been built in 724 CE under the order of Emperor Shōmu. The temple has been rebuilt a few times over the years, with a major rebuilding around 1602 CE by the Japanese court officials Toyotomi Hideyori and Toyotomi Hideyoshi. The temple looks to be of Amida style architecture. The temple's gate is originally from the Toyokuni Shrine in Kyoto, but was moved to Chikubu Island during the renovations in 1602. The artwork on the temple's gate has features reminiscent of the Momoyama Period.

Significance of location
The Hogon-ji Temple is special because of its location on Chikubu Island in the Shiga Prefecture in Japan (see fig. 1). Chikubu Island is supposedly one of the places where the goddess Benzaiten, who is related to water and one of the Seven Gods of Luck, lived.  As Benzaiten supposedly had lived on the island since it had formed, the story goes that one day Amaterasu OmiKami, the goddess who is said to have built Japan, appeared to the reigning Emperor Shōmu and told him to build structures in order to worship Benzaiten. Thus in 724, the temple complex that includes the Hogon-ji Temple and the nearby Tsukubusuma Hall was originally built. The temple ranks with the Enoshima Shrine in the Kanto Region, and the Itsukushima Shrine in the Chugoku Region as the three great Japanese shrines dedicated to the goddess Benzaiten. The area of Lake Biwa and the surrounding mountains are mentioned many times in the famous story of The Tale of Genji.

Significance of religion
The Emperor Shōmu who had the temple originally built was a practitioner of Buddhism. This is important in that the Hogon-ji Temple was built in honor of the goddess Benzaiten, the Japanese adaptation of the Indian goddess Sarasvati, who is also the goddess of eloquence, learning, military prowess, and a musician. The original temple was rebuilt in 1602 so there is no real documentation on what it actually looked like. However, the rebuilt Hogon-ji Temple strongly resembles the common architectural attributes of a Buddhist Amida Hall. Amida Halls, however, did not reportedly start being built until around 1051 CE It is therefore apparent that the style of architecture changed with the reconstruction.

The Hogon-ji Temple is home to statues and a miniature pagoda in memorial to other deities, as well. There is a statue of Acala, a Buddhist deity that is attributed as being the protector of Buddhism and to aid all beings in showing them the law of the Buddha. Acala is most always seen as having a stern facial expression, holding a sword in his right hand and a rope in his left, and also being surrounded by fire. This particular statue is made of a single piece of wood, and is from around the 12th century. The mandorla, or halo around the entire body, of flames are painted and look very intricate. At one time the entire statue may have been painted. The statue's musculature looks very detailed and slightly rounded and soft, a trait reminiscent of Indian works of art. Also, the deity appears to be standing on a rock. This stance on a rock is supposedly another common trait of the iconography of Acala that symbolizes the serenity that he imparts to his followers.

Another statue is that of a miniature pagoda (see fig. 2). The pagoda is made out of stone supposedly from the famous Mount Hiei.  Due to its special origin, it is only one of seven stone monuments like it. It is five tiered and has an umbrella-like decoration on the top of it. This spire decoration is symbolic of the Buddha and his royalty. Also, on the bottom tier on each side is a picture of Buddha. The architectural style of the pagoda is reminiscent of the style of the Kamakura Period. This is evidenced in the increased incline of the top story roof.

There is also a sculpture of Benzaiten herself at the temple. Of the three most famous sculptures of this goddess in Japan, the one at Hogon-ji is supposedly the oldest. Also, each year during the very important Lotus Festival a new sculpture of Benzaiten is made and enshrined at the Hogon-ji Temple. An example of these sculptures is this representation of Uga Benzaiten that dates to around 1614 CE (see fig. 3). This sculpture is painted wood, and is approximately 65 centimeters tall.  Uga Benzaiten is a representation of Benzaiten that emphasized her martial qualities and divine power. As shown, Benzaiten is pictured with eight arms, a Buddhist trait, thus emphasizing her greatness and divinity. She is shown holding several types of weapons such as a bow, and sword. However, in her middle right hand she is holding a key. The key along with the magic jewel she is holding in the left hand closest to the middle, are symbols of her abilities in bringing good fortune. On her head is a torii gate for her crown, along with a figure that has a body of a snake and the head of an old man. The lines of the sculpture are very curvy, rounded, and softer looking; yet, because the sculpture is made of wood, Benzaiten looks very stiff and iconic. Because of these stylistic traits, the sculpture was probably influenced by Indian Buddhist iconography.

The Hogon-ji Temple is also part of the Saigoku Kannon Pilgrimage. The Saigoku Kannon Pilgrimage, also known as the Kansai Kannon Pilgrimage, is one of the many traditional religious pilgrimages one can take. This particular one is dedicated to Kannon, the Japanese Buddhist adaptation of the Boddhisattva Guanyin and the Boddhisattva Avalokitasvara. Kannon is mainly represented in 33 different forms; therefore, there are 33 temples in the pilgrimage. In Japan, Kannon's form as the "Goddess of Mercy" is especially popular. In this pilgrimage the Hogon-ji Temple is number 30 on the list of 33 temples. The Saigoku Kannon Pilgrimage is a "miracle pilgrimage," for each temple is somehow related to a miracle of Kannon. An example is the Kannonsho-ji Temple that was supposedly built at the request of a merman so that he could worship Kannon.

Significance of remodeling
As previously stated, the Hogon-ji Temple was majorly rebuilt in 1602 by the court officials Toyotomi Hideyori and Toyotomi Hideyoshi. The temple's architecture must have been altered from the original style because the temple's style looks to be closely related to the popular Buddhist Amida style halls. Also, the renovation in 1602 was when the gate from the Toyokuni Shrine in Kyoto was moved to Chikubu Island and made the gate for the Hogon-ji Temple. The gate has features reminiscent of Momoyama Period artwork. Then later in 1942 the temple was rebuilt again.

Architectural style
The Hogon-ji Temple (see fig. 4) seen today is very reminiscent of the Amida style Buddhist halls and is a good example of traditional Japanese twists on Chinese architecture. This can be seen in the Chinese trait of the temple being off the ground on a base platform. However, despite the fact that the temple is on an elevated platform, it does not make the building look isolated and removed from its environment as some Chinese structures appear to be, but instead the Japanese architects have made it appear as if it is floating on the terrain and integrated with the environment. The fact that the Hogon-ji Temple was built in honor of Benzaiten probably explains why the temple looks like it is floating on the ground and why flowing lines in the architecture are important.  The temple obviously uses the traditional Chinese and Japanese post-and-lintel style. This is evidenced in the vertical columns that support horizontal beams. The front of the temple appears to have three bays or architectural sections, kens in Japanese terms: one bay on the left side of the doors, the bay with the three doors, and the bay on the right side of the doors. On top of the wooden vertical columns in the front of the temple are typical Japanese 3-on-1 bracket complexes. These bracket complexes are what support the horizontal beams above them. The three part eave on the front of the temple is a stylistic trait of the Amida Halls. The middle section of the temple's exterior makes the temple look as if it is more than one story; however, due to the style of Amida Halls it is most likely just a mokoshi. A mokoshi being a gap in the architectural rafters that make a structure appear more stories than it actually is. Mokoshis also make a structure appear as if it has one roof over another. Note the three-stepped bracket complexes that support the actual roof. Three-stepped bracket complexes are composed of three of the 3-on-1 looking brackets stacked on top of each other with each 3-on-1 bracket supporting a ceiling beam. The ends of these beams can be seen decoratively sticking out from the structure at the corners of the actual roof. This bracket system is a very common trait of traditional Japanese architecture. Also it is documented that the more complex a structure's bracket system is, the more important it supposedly is. Therefore, the Hogon-ji Temple would have been pretty important seeing how it has the complex three-stepped bracketing system. The square flying rafters that extend just to the edge of the underside of the eave roofs and actual roof are an excellent touch that both accentuates the curvature of the roofs and adds a natural element of simple decoration. As apparent, the roof is indeed curved, a trait carried over from Chinese architecture. However, Chinese curved roofs were curved much shallower than their Japanese successors. As seen in fig. 4, the curvature of the temple's actual roof is quite drastic. Also, the downward angle of the actual roof itself is quite steep. This angle is most likely to help with rainwater run-off and symbolic of apotropaic qualities. Curved roofs were commonly believed to ward off evil spirits because evil spirits hated curves and that they would also fall off of the roof due to its drastic angle. Thus, curved roofs are very commonly used in Chinese and Japanese architecture. The sag in both the eave roof and the actual roof is a trait reminiscent of Chinese architecture. Yet, the upward turned corners of the roof are a distinctly Japanese trait that was not seen in Japanese architecture before the Heian period. The temple has what is termed a hogyō, a pyramidal roof that converges at a central point. Also commonly seen in Chinese and Japanese architecture are ridges curving along the top curves of the actual roof. Overall, the architecture of the temple is very plain and undecorated compared to some of the more ornate temples. This could be because the temple is Buddhist and therefore, its patrons hold to the idea of moderation in life. Yet, because of its simplicity it looks very elegant, flowing, and natural in the surrounding environment.

Hogon-ji's gate
The Gate of the Hogon-ji Temple, known as the Karamon Gate, was moved to its current location during the temple's renovation in 1602 (see fig. 5). It was originally from the Toyokuni Shrine in Kyoto that was dedicated to Toyotomi Hideyoshi. The gate itself is an excellent example of Momoyama Period artwork known for its extensive decoration and vibrant colors, even though the architecture of the gate is more Chinese than Japanese. Another aspect to notice is the presence of Buddhist iconography in the gate's artwork. One facet of the Karamon Gate's Chinese architecture is that it uses the previously mentioned post-and-lintel style. Also, the structure uses the common 3-on-1 bracket complexes in holding up the gate and the gate's roof. The gate has a karahafu, or "Chinese gable" roof. As seen in fig. 5, the gate has a unique roof curvature that is distinctly Chinese in style. The gate is highly decorated with wood carvings, metal ornaments, polychrome, and sculptural forms. Paintings and carvings of flowers are vastly used overall in the gate's décor, and one entire side of the doors is covered in wood carvings of Peonies. Also, seen in the triangular space on the side of the roof is a bright gold phoenix sculptural figure and cloud decorations. Phoenixes are also a popular decoration for this gate. Not only are phoenixes seen on the side of the roof, but they are also seen at the top of the door on side 1 (see fig. 5). Phoenixes are not the only mythological creature portrayed in the decorations of this gate. On the bracket complex on the left door post appears to be the head of a Japanese Lion Dog. These dogs are a common thing to see near Japanese temples and shrines. This is because they are seen as apotropaic, and supposedly ward off evil spirits. They are most often seen in pairs, representing the duality of life. They are Buddhist in origin because their image originated from the lion, which was a symbol of Buddha. The amount of decoration and vibrancy of colors used on the Karamon Gate appear to be a complete antithesis to the Hogon-ji Temple itself. By the differences in style, architecture, and decoration, it is obvious that the gate is not a part of the original temple complex.

The open Funa Corridor that leads to another shrine on the island, Tsukubusuma Shrine (see fig. 8). The Funa Corridor is special because it is built of the wood of the "Nihonmaru," Toyotomi Hideyoshi's ship.

Hogon-ji's pagoda
Up a flight of stairs from the Hogon-ji Temple is the temple complex's pagoda (see fig. 9). It burned down in the early Edo Period and was rebuilt following the original plan. The pagoda is three tiered and reminiscent of traditional Japanese style pagodas in architecture. It is of traditional orange and red coloring. Also, it uses the traditional post-and-lintel style, as previously explained. It has three-stepped bracket complexes, as previously discussed. It consists of three bays, and a central core that runs the entire height of the structure ending in the finial on top. The central pole is evidence that pagodas are like Indian stupas in that it is a common trait in the architecture. The finial  on top is a symbol of the Buddha, in that it represents an umbrella. An umbrella being significant in that it is a symbol of the historical Buddha's royal lineage and prestige. Pagodas in general are a Japanese adaptation of the Indian stupa. This is also evidenced by the fact that pagodas were for inducing meditation, circumambulation, and supposedly held a relic of Buddha. This pagoda has two main apotropaic characteristics. One is the obvious curved roof. The other characteristic is the bells hanging at the corners of the roofs that supposedly scare off evil spirits. Overall, the architecture of this structure looks much more decorated than that of the Hogon-ji Temple in its complex use of intersecting beams on the exterior as ornamentation.

Hogon-ji's treasure house
Next to the temple complex's pagoda is the Treasure House. Here several important artifacts relevant to the temple's history are stored. An example of such artifacts include: tapestries, pipes, Nō masks, swords, and Buddhas. A tapestry of Benzaiten resides there. In it she is portrayed with only two arms and a biwa, or Japanese lute. This form that emphasized her musical attributes was very popular in Japanese artwork. Seen around her head is a halo, thus emphasizing her divinity. Her robes look very soft due to the curvy lines used. This image is much more reminiscent of the Japanese iconography of deities than that of Indian iconography because the figure appears as organic and soft, not a stiff, stern, and untouchable being. Another evidence of this is the fact that the lines used are not geometric, a trait common in the Indian iconography of deities.

 Nō masks worn by the actors in that type of theatre (see fig. 11) are especially relevant to the temple's history in that Chikubu Island was the location and Benzaiten was the subject of the famous Nō play, Chikubushima. The play follows the pilgrimage of a court official to Chikubu Island in his journey to pay homage to the deity there. He arrives at the island by an old couples fishing boat and then learns his lesson of judging people because it actually turns out that the old woman is Benzaiten, and the old man the Dragon God of Lake Biwa. The play finally ends with Benzaiten and the Dragon God of Lake Biwa returning to their divine abodes after they both have performed marvelous dances.

See also
Three Great Shrines of Benzaiten

References

Further reading
 Lady Murasaki. (1925). The tale of genji. (A. Waley, Trans.) New York, NY: Houghton Mifflin Company.
 Piggott, J. R. (1997). The emergence of Japanese kingship. Stanford, CA: Stanford University Press.
 Gunsaulus, H. C. (1924). Gods and heroes of Japan. Chicago, IL: Field Museum of Natural History.

External links

 https://web.archive.org/web/20150725134914/http://www.taleofgenji.org/
 http://www.taleofgenji.org/saigoku_pilgrimage.html

Buddhist temples in Shiga Prefecture
National Treasures of Japan
Important Cultural Properties of Japan
Zen temples